Jody Gall (born 6 June 1974) is an Australian former professional rugby league footballer who played for the Penrith Panthers and the North Queensland Cowboys in the NRL.

Gall played for the NSW City Origin team in 2001.

Playing career
Gall made his first grade debut for Penrith against the Illawarra Steelers in round 10 1994 at Penrith Park which ended in a 26-26 draw.  

In 1997, Penrith joined the rival Super League competition during the Super League war.  Gall played in both of Penrith's finals matches as they made it to the semi-finals before they were eliminated by Canberra.

In 1999, Gall signed with North Queensland and spent one season with the club as they finished second last on the table.  In 2000, Gall rejoined Penrith.  At the end of the 2000 NRL season, Penrith finished 5th on the table and qualified for the finals.  Gall played in both of Penrith's finals matches which ended in defeat.

In the 2001 NRL season, Gall played 17 games for Penrith as the club endured a horror season on the field finishing last and claimed the wooden spoon.  

Gall's final game in the top grade came during the 2002 NRL season against North Queensland which ended in a 28-18 loss at Penrith Park in round 7.

References

External links
CrossFit profile
Numbered Athlete Profile-No.6 Jody Gall

1974 births
Living people
Australian rugby league players
Rugby league props
Rugby league second-rows
Penrith Panthers players
North Queensland Cowboys players
New South Wales City Origin rugby league team players